This is a list of road, railway, waterway, and other tunnels in the United Kingdom.

A tunnel is an underground passageway with no defined minimum length, though it may be considered to be at least twice as long as wide.

A tunnel may be for pedestrians or cyclists, for general road traffic, for motor vehicles only, for rail traffic, or for a canal. Some are aqueducts, constructed purely for carrying water—for consumption, for hydroelectric purposes or as sewers—while others carry other services such as telecommunications cables. There are even tunnels designed as wildlife crossings for European badgers and other endangered species.

This will be superseded in the 2020s by the  Woodsmith Mine Tunnel in North Yorkshire that will transport polyhalite from North Yorkshire to a port on Teesside.

England

Wales

Northern Ireland

Scotland

See also 
 List of bridges in the United Kingdom
 Subterranean London

References

Notes

Bibliography 

 Alan Blower, British Railway Tunnels, (Ian Allan Ltd, 1964).
 J.C. Gagg, Book of Canal Tunnels, (J.Gagg, 1976), 
 David Jacobs, Bridges, canals & tunnels, (Princeton, N.J, 1968).
 David J. Appleby, Allan C. Gilbert, and Stephen P. Samuel, Canal Tunnels of England and Wales, (Aylestone, 2001), 
 

United Kingdom
 
Tunnels in the United Kingdom
Tunnels
Tunnels